The Charles L. Beatty House, also known as the Kendrick Building, on Capitol Avenue in Cheyenne, Wyoming, was built in 1916.  It was listed on the National Register of Historic Places in 1990.

It is an American Foursquare house designed by architect William Robert Dubois.

The listing included two contributing buildings.

It is located across from the Wyoming State Capitol.  The building was the home of the Wyoming Arts Council for two decades, until January 2015, when WAC moved to the Barrett Building, co-locating with the Wyoming State Museum.

References

Houses on the National Register of Historic Places in Wyoming
Houses completed in 1916
Laramie County, Wyoming